

Drama
 God's Country, a 1988 play by Steven Dietz

Film 

 God's Country (1946 film), a Western film directed by Robert Emmett Tansey
 God's Country (1985 film), a documentary film by French filmmaker Louis Malle
 God's Country (2011 film), family film directed by Chris Armstrong
 God's Country (2022 film), thriller film

Music

Songs 
 "God's Country", a song from the 1939 film adaptation of the musical Babes in Arms
 "God's Country" (Blake Shelton song), a 2019 song by Blake Shelton

Albums 
 God's Country: George Jones and Friends, a 2006 tribute album
 God's Country, working title for Donda, the 2021 album by Kanye West
 God's Country, the 2022 debut album by Chat Pile

See also
 "In God's Country", a 1987 U2 song
 God's Country Radio Network, a 2008–2010 Christian music network
Back to God's Country (disambiguation)
 God's Own Country (disambiguation)
 God's Kingdom